Bucek Depp a.k.a. Bucek (born Al Arthur Muchtar, 29 January 1973)  is an Indonesian model and actor.

Career
His father Yus Mahfud Muchtar is a betawi of Arab descent and his mother Eleonora is Dutch. His real name is Al Arthur Muchtar, his moniker Bucek Depp was given to him as a teen when he started his modeling career. He is the older brother of the Indonesian actor Al Fathir Muchtar who was also a model in his youth, and the brother-in-law of the actress Fera Feriska (since 2006).

Filmography
 Sekretaris (1991)
 Pengantin Remaja (1991)
 Kuldesak (1998)
 Beth (2002)
 Brownies (2005)
 Mereka Bilang, Saya Monyet! (2008)
 Operation Wedding (2013)
 Cinta Brontosaurus (2013)
 Merry Go Round (2013)
 Manusia Setengah Salmon (2013)
 7 Misi Rahasia Sophie (2014)
 Me & You vs The World (2014)
 Marmut Merah Jambu (2014)
 Air & Api (2015)
 Tiger Boy (2015)
 Dilan 1991 (2019)

Soap Opera 
 Nadin (2017) as Chanda

Video Clips

References

External links
 
  Profil Bucek Depp Kapanlagi.com
 Instagram Bucek Depp

Living people
1973 births
Indonesian male models
Indonesian actors
21st-century Indonesian male actors
Indonesian male television actors
Male actors from Jakarta
Indonesian Muslims
Indo people
Betawi people
Indonesian people of Arab descent
Indonesian people of Dutch descent
Indonesian people of Yemeni descent